Embryo donation is one disposition option for users of in vitro fertilisation with remaining fresh or frozen embryos. It is defined as the giving—generally without compensation—of  embryos remaining after in vitro fertilization procedures to recipients for procreative implantation or research. Most IVF users with supernumerary embryos make embryo donation decisions after completing their families or discontinuing use of in vitro fertilization. Recipients of embryos donated for procreative implantation typically plan to transfer fresh or frozen embryos into a prepared uterus in order to facilitate pregnancy and childbirth. Recipients of embryos donated for research typically use them for clinical training, quality improvement research, or human embryonic stem cell research.

For procreative implantation
Embryo donation for procreative implantation is a form of third party reproduction. Embryo donation can be anonymous (donor and recipient parties are not known to each other, and individuals have no ability to contact one another), semi-open (parties can interact via a third party, but do not share personally identifiable information in order to provide a layer of privacy protection), open (party identities and contact information are shared so the families can interact directly in various types of relationships), or ID disclosure (donor-conceived youth can request and receive donor contact information when the donor-conceived reaches the age of 18). Any children born from embryo donation for procreation would be biologically related to the gamete donors used when creating the embryos. This is the same principle as is followed in egg donation or sperm donation.

Embryo donation or adoption 

Some use the term "embryo donation" to refer strictly to anonymous embryo donation, and "embryo adoption" to refer to an open relationship. Others use the terms interchangeably because, regardless of the relationship, a clinical assisted reproduction procedure is involved, and the recipient couple is preparing to raise a child not genetically related to them. Lawyers who assist those trying to acquire an embryo state the term "embryo adoption" is a misnomer because the transfer of an embryo is handled as property transfer. One newspaper article in 2005 asserted that abortion rights advocates, advocates of embryonic stem cell research, and members of the fertility industry object to referring to the transfer as an "adoption" because they feel it gives an embryo the same status as a child. Most doctors describe the process as "embryo donation". According to a CBS News article dated July 28, 2005,[full citation needed] the term "Snowflake baby" was coined by the first agency to provide the adoption service, Nightlight Christian Adoptions. Their embryo adoption program is called the Snowflakes® Embryo Adoption Program and over 950 babies have been born from this program.

Donor options 

According to a survey by the American Society for Reproductive Medicine, 54% of fertility patients want to preserve their remaining embryos for future use. Another 21% want to donate leftover embryos for research. Donating embryos for research may be a good alternative when patients receive proper, honest and clear information about the research project, the procedures and the scientific value of the research. The remaining 7% of those surveyed are willing to donate leftover embryos to another couple.

Dr. Jeffrey Nelson is Director of the Huntington Reproductive Center, one of California's largest IVF clinics. He reports that "Twenty-five per cent of patients want to donate their [spare] embryos – not as many as I'd like." He added, "People tend to hold on to their embryos because they don't want to make a decision. We started buying more and more cryopreservation tanks, and we finally had to say that there's a fee for a certain number of years' storage, and beyond that the price starts to escalate."  It costs up to $1,200 a year to store frozen embryos. As of May 2012, there were about 600,000 frozen embryos stored in laboratories and fertility clinics, costing the donor families about $72 million annually for storage fees.

Donor screening 

In the United States, donors must, if possible, be screened for a series of infectious diseases. The U.S. Food and Drug Administration (FDA) administers the rules for screening donors. If the donors are not available to be screened, the embryos must be given a label that indicates that the required screening has not been done, and the recipients must agree to accept the associated risk. The amount of screening the embryo has already undergone is largely dependent on the genetic parents' own IVF clinic and process. The embryo recipient may elect to have her own embryologist conduct further testing.

or donating them for use in embryonic stem cell research. Although embryos can, theoretically, survive indefinitely in frozen storage, as a practical reality someone must eventually decide on a permanent disposition for them.

A US study concluded that donating an embryo is approximately twice as cost-effective as oocyte donation in terms of cost per live birth, with a cost of $22,000 per live delivery compared to $41,000 for oocyte donation.

History 

Soon after in vitro fertilization became a common clinical practice, clinicians discovered a way to preserve embryos in frozen storage and thaw them for implantation later. This procedure can spare a woman donor from a second egg harvesting procedure.

At about the same time, clinicians reasoned that more couples could be helped toward parenthood by substituting donor sperm for men who have no viable sperm, or donor eggs for women who have no viable oocytes – or both. Thus what was called gamete and embryo donation, came into being. A careful reading of the 1983 clinical report often cited as the first instance of embryo donation  reveals that the donated embryo was actually created for the recipient at the same time that four embryos were made for the donor couple's own use.  The menstrual cycles of the donor and recipient women were synchronized using medications, and the transfers occurred on the same day. None of these embryos had been cryopreserved.

Soon thereafter, reports were published documenting successful pregnancies and births from cryopreserved donor embryos. Again, however, these were embryos made from donor gametes specifically for the recipients.

No one knows for sure when the first true embryo adoption occurred. The term was used as early as the mid-1980s,  in the legal literature. Devroey et al., Dr. Maria Bustillo in Florida, and Dr. Howard Jones in Virginia have reported embryo transfers occurring between 1986 and 1990 that clearly represented adoption of remaining embryos.

Prior to this, thousands of women who were infertile had regarded adoption as the only available path to parenthood. These scientific advances set the stage to allow open and candid discussion of embryo donation and transfer as a solution to infertility.  In some ways, it is similar to other donations such as blood and major organ donations.  Some see the embryo as "tissue", others see it as a "gift of a potential life", while still others believe that a new human life begins at the time of fertilization.  The third group sees embryo donation as little different from traditional adoption, except that the recipient woman has the experience of pregnancy and childbirth, and that no court action is required to establish legal parentage for the recipient.

The matter gained another political dimension in the United States when Congress and the Bush administration budgeted $1 million to promote embryo adoption.

Process 

Embryo donation is legally considered a property transfer and not an adoption by state laws. However, Georgia enacted a statute called the "Option of Adoption Act" in 2009 which provided a procedure for, but (importantly) did not require—a confirmatory court order of parentage following embryo adoption.  One advantage some embryo adoption couples in Georgia have derived from this law is that they have become eligible for the federal Adoption Tax Credit.

Embryo donation can be carried out as a service of an individual infertility clinic (where donor and recipient families typically live in the local area and are both patients of the same clinic) or by any of several national organizations. The process described below is typical of an "adoption-agency-based" national program.

Genetic parents entering an embryo adoption program are offered the benefits of selecting the adoptive parents from the agency's pool of prescreened applicants. Embryo ownership is transferred directly from the genetic parents to the adoptive parents. Genetic parents may be updated by the agency when a successful pregnancy is achieved and when a child or children is/are born. The genetic parents and adoptive parents may negotiate their own terms for future contact between the families.

Prospective adoptive parents entering a program complete an application,  and may also complete a traditional adoption home study, fertility or adoption education, background and health checks and in some cases, depending on the requirements of both the home study and placement agencies, court certification of adoption eligibility. Their completed paperwork and fees are submitted to the placement agency, which reviews their file. Some agencies allow the donors to choose the recipient while others match the recipient parents with similar preferences including desired level of openness post-adoption. Genetic and prospective parents are then given the chance to approve the match. Once all parties agree, the embryo is transferred to the adoptive mother's clinic for a frozen embryo transfer.

None of the procedures involved with embryo adoption by either the genetic or adopting parents are legal requirements of embryo transfer. The process is entered into willingly by both sets of parents because of the added safeguards, knowledge and communication offered to both parties by the system.

For research
Embryo donation to research provides a major source of stem cells for stem cell research. The hope is that stem cell research will aid in finding cures for various major diseases such as Alzheimer, cancer, SMA, and Parkinson's diseases.  Some stem cell research is done by using human embryos, and one option that parents have once they are done with in vitro fertilization is to donate their unused embryos to stem cell research. One review came to the result that the proportion of IVF users who donated embryos for research varied geographically, from 7% in France to 73% in Switzerland. A study done in the United States revealed that 60% of American donors would donate the unused embryos to science.

People who donate embryos for research often have been found in a review to report feelings of reciprocity towards science and medicine, positive views of research and high levels of trust in the medical system. They have described the decision to donate as better than the destruction of embryos, and as an opportunity to help others or to improve health and IVF technology. On the other hand, reported factors that make people refrain from embryo donation to research include a perception of risks, a lack of information concerning research projects and the medical system, as well as conceptualization of embryos in terms of personhood. The influence of sociodemographic characteristics and reproductive and gynecological history have mainly been found to be inconclusive.

See also
Assisted reproductive technology
Snowflake children
Snowflakes® Embryo Adoption & Donation

References

External links
Preborn Babies
National Registry for Adoption
National Embryo Donation Center
Embryo Adoption & Embryo Donation Academy

Fertility medicine
Giving